The 78th District of the Iowa House of Representatives in the state of Iowa.

Current elected officials
Jarad Klein is the representative currently representing the district.

Past representatives
The district has previously been represented by:
 Dennis L. Freeman, 1969–1971
 Elizabeth Orr Shaw, 1971–1973
 Brice Oakley, 1973–1977
 Hugo Schnekloth, 1977–1983
 Dennis L. Renaud, 1983–1993
 Dwight Dinkla, 1993–1999
 Clel Baudler, 1999–2003
 Vicki Lensing, 2003–2013
 Jarad Klein, 2013–present

References

078